

332001–332100 

|-id=084
| 332084 Vasyakulbeda ||  || Vasyl' Kulbeda (born 1954), an engineer at the Department for Solar Physics of the Main Astronomical Observatory of the Ukrainian National Academy of Sciences. || 
|}

332101–332200 

|-id=183
| 332183 Jaroussky ||  || Philippe Jaroussky (born 1978), a French countertenor || 
|}

332201–332300 

|-bgcolor=#f2f2f2
| colspan=4 align=center | 
|}

332301–332400 

|-id=324
| 332324 Bobmcdonald ||  || Bob McDonald (born 1951), a distinguished award-winning science journalist and educator. || 
|-id=326
| 332326 Aresi ||  || Paolo Aresi (born 1958), an Italian journalist and science fiction writer. || 
|}

332401–332500 

|-bgcolor=#f2f2f2
| colspan=4 align=center | 
|}

332501–332600 

|-id=530
| 332530 Canders ||  || Fridrihs Canders or Friedrich Zander (1887–1933), a Baltic-German pioneer of rocketry and spaceflight in Russia || 
|}

332601–332700 

|-id=632
| 332632 Pharos ||  || The Pharos of Alexandria was considered one of the seven wonders of the ancient world. This lighthouse, one of the tallest structures in the world at the time, was built on the island of Pharos, in front of the port of Alexandria of Egypt, and was destroyed by two earthquakes. || 
|}

332701–332800 

|-id=706
| 332706 Karlheidlas ||  || Karl Heidlas (born 1932), a German chemist and amateur astronomer. || 
|-id=733
| 332733 Drolshagen ||  || Gerhard Drolshagen (born 1953), the co-manager of the Near-Earth Object program of the European Space Agency. || 
|}

332801–332900 

|-bgcolor=#f2f2f2
| colspan=4 align=center | 
|}

332901–333000 

|-bgcolor=#f2f2f2
| colspan=4 align=center | 
|}

References 

332001-333000